Seis (stylised in all caps) is the seventh studio album by Chilean singer and songwriter Mon Laferte. It was released on April 8, 2021 through Universal Music Mexico. It was produced by Manu Jalil, who also produced La Trenza, and Sebastián Aracena, and featured collaborations with Mexican singers Gloria Trevi and Alejandro Fernández, and Mexican bandas La Arrolladora Banda El Limón de René Camacho and Mujeres del Viento Florido.

At the 22nd Annual Latin Grammy Awards, the album won Best Singer-Songwriter Album, the song "Que Se Sepa Nuestro Amor" was nominated for Song of the Year and Best Regional Song and the song "La Mujer" was nominated for Best Pop Song. At the 64th Annual Grammy Awards, the album was nominated for Best Regional Mexican Music Album (including Tejano), being Laferte's first Grammy award nomination.

Background
Laferte found inspiration for the album from Regional Mexican music and also after watching the documentary Chavela about Costa Rican-born Mexican singer Chavela Vargas, with whom she felt a connection due to both having the life story of coming to Mexico as an immigrant and living in Tepoztlán. The album explores themes of power, desire and womanhood in song such as "Se Me Va la Vida" ("My Life is Running Out") alongside the banda Mujeres del Viento Florido, which is about Chilean women prisoners and "La Mujer" ("The Woman") with Gloria Trevi, which according to Laferte, started as a "toxic" song but was re-written afterwards and turned into a song about "ending a relationship and the survival instict", describing it as a "healing process".

The album title, Seis (six in Spanish), refers to the fact that the album is her sixth under the name Mon Laferte; however, it is actually her seventh album overall since her first studio album, La Chica de Rojo (2003), was released under her legal name, Monserrat Bustamante.

Singles
The first single was "Que Se Sepa Nuestro Amor" with Alejandro Fernández, released on September 17, 2020. The second single, "Se Me Va A Quemar El Corazón", was released on January 21, 2021. "La Mujer", a collaboration with Gloria Trevi was released on April 7, 2021 as the third single.

Critical reception

Thom Jurek from All Music gave the album four out of five stars, naming the album a "milestone" alongside Norma in Laferte's career, he also wrote that "each track is delivered with the consistency, care, honesty, and obsessive attention to detail that Laferte's poetic lyrics and melodies require", ending the review with "the humble presentation here contrasts with her songwriting ambition in what amounts to a truly visionary work of popular art".

SEIS was ranked at number 14 in the list for "The 35 Best Spanish-Language and Bilingual Albums of 2021" by the American magazine Rolling Stone, calling it "impressively textured".

Track listing
All tracks are produced by Manú Jalil and Sebastián Aracena.

References

2021 albums
Mon Laferte albums